Antonio Berber Martínez (born 13 November 1977) is a Mexican politician from the National Action Party. From 2006 to 2009 he served as Deputy of the LX Legislature of the Mexican Congress representing Michoacán.

References

1977 births
Living people
Politicians from Michoacán
National Action Party (Mexico) politicians
21st-century Mexican politicians
Deputies of the LX Legislature of Mexico
Members of the Chamber of Deputies (Mexico) for Michoacán